John V. Farrelly (born 4 November 1954) is a former Irish Fine Gael politician and auctioneer. He was a TD for the Meath constituency from 1981 to 1992 and 1997 to 2002. He was a member of Seanad Éireann from 1993 to 1997. He was a member of Meath County Council from 1999 to 2014.

He was educated at St Finian's College, Mullingar and Warrenstown Agricultural College, County Meath. Farrelly was first elected to Dáil Éireann at the 1981 general election and retained his seat until losing it at the 1992 general election to Labour's Brian Fitzgerald. He was elected to Seanad Éireann on the Agricultural Panel in 1993. He regained the Dáil seat at the 1997 general election but lost it at the 2002 general election to party colleague Damien English. He did not contest the 2005 Meath by-election when Fine Gael's John Bruton retired.

In June 2013 he was appointed Cathaoirleach (chairperson) of Meath County Council. He lost his seat at the 2014 local elections.

References

1954 births
Living people
Fine Gael TDs
Local councillors in County Meath
Members of the 22nd Dáil
Members of the 23rd Dáil
Members of the 24th Dáil
Members of the 25th Dáil
Members of the 26th Dáil
Members of the 20th Seanad
Members of the 28th Dáil
Irish farmers
Fine Gael senators
People educated at St Finian's College